The men's freestyle welterweight competition at the 1932 Summer Olympics in Los Angeles took place from 1 August to 3 August at the Grand Olympic Auditorium. Nations were limited to one competitor. This weight class was limited to wrestlers weighing up to 72kg.

This freestyle wrestling competition did not use the single-elimination bracket format previously used for Olympic freestyle wrestling but instead followed the format that was introduced at the 1928 Summer Olympics for Greco-Roman wrestling, using an elimination system based on the accumulation of points. Each round featured all wrestlers pairing off and wrestling one bout (with one wrestler having a bye if there were an odd number). The loser received 3 points. The winner received 1 point if the win was by decision and 0 points if the win was by fall. At the end of each round, any wrestler with at least 5 points was eliminated.

Schedule

Results

Round 1

Of the four bouts, three were won by fall to give the victors 0 points, along with Zombori who had a bye. Földeak had the only win by decision, starting with 1 point. The four losers each received 3 points. Lopez withdrew after his loss.

 Bouts

 Points

Round 2

All three of the remaining first-round losers lost again and were eliminated. In the bout between two 0-point wrestlers, MacDonald won by fall to stay at 0 points.

 Bouts

 Points

Round 3

Leino won by default (Zombori defaulting and being eliminated) and Földeak had a bye, staying at 1 and 2 points, respectively. The only contested bout featured van Bebber and MacDonald, with the American beating the Canadian by decision.

 Bouts

 Points

Round 4

MacDonald eliminated Földeak in this round, leaving three wrestlers. The bout between Leino and van Bebber therefore became the final and was considered part of the final round.

 Bouts

 Points

Final round

Van Bebber defeated Leino to win the gold medal. Leino then faced MacDonald for the silver and bronze; the Canadian prevailed.

 Bouts

 Points

References

Wrestling at the 1932 Summer Olympics